Om Bobbo Viking is the debut studio album by Swedish pop and rock artist Magnus Uggla. It was released in 1975. The musicians that perform on the album were originally from Harpos band.

Track listing
All tracks are written by Uggla.

Side one
 "Hallå" ("Hello") - 3:08
 "Mrs Space" - 3:00
 "John Silver" - 2:30
 "Rock’n roll revolution" - 3:45
 "Riddarna av mörkret" ("Knights of Darkness") - 3:50
Side two
 "Bobbo Viking" - 2:24
 "Flens rock" ("The Rock of Flen") - 2:43
 "Okänd värld" ("Unknown World") - 3:18
 "Raggarna" - 3:13
 "Starlet" - 4:16

Personnel
Magnus Uggla – vocals
Roland Hermin – bass
Kjell Jeppsson – drums
Finn Sjöberg – guitar, flute
Anders Olander – keyboard
Christer Eklund – saxophone

References

External links

1975 debut albums
Magnus Uggla albums
Swedish-language albums